Jolene was an alternative rock band based in North Carolina, often described as alt-country.

Members
Dave Burris - guitar, backing vocals, keyboards
John Crooke - lead vocals, guitar, keyboards, percussion
Mike Kennerly - drums, percussion
Rodney Lanier - keyboards, pedal steel guitar
Mike Mitschele - bass guitar, bass synth, programming

History
After discovering a cassette copy of R.E.M.'s Fables of the Reconstruction, John Crooke was inspired to form a band with his cousin Dave Burris, and two long-time friends, Mike Kennerly and Mike Mitschele. After touring for six months, Jolene was spotted at a show in Nashville and signed to Memphis-based independent label Ardent Records, where they recorded their debut LP, Hell's Half Acre, released in 1996.

Jolene signed with the major label Sire Records eighteen months later. With Sire, they released their second LP In The Gloaming in 1998. The band expanded to a five-piece during this time, with the addition of multi-instrumentalist Rodney Lanier. 

In 1998 Jolene supported Hootie & the Blowfish on their final UK tour, playing the last show on October 31, at the Shepherd's Bush Empire, London.

In 1999, Jolene joined Blue Rose Records, and released two albums on that label.

John Crooke and Dave Burris are currently involved with the LA-based band Lamps.

Lanier died on December 9, 2011, from cancer, at the age of 44.

Discography

References

External links
Jolene's record label website (in German)
Profile of In The Gloaming by Rolling Stone

Musical groups from North Carolina
Sire Records artists
American alternative country groups